Safe mode is a diagnostic mode of a computer operating system (OS). It can also refer to a mode of operation by application software. Safe mode is intended to help fix most, if not all, problems within an operating system. It is also widely used for removing rogue security software.

Background 
Microsoft Windows, macOS, Android and Linux distributions such as Ubuntu and Linux Mint are examples of contemporary operating systems that implement a safe mode (called "Safe Boot" in macOS) as well as other complex electronic devices.

In safe mode, an operating system has reduced functionality, but the task of isolating problems is easier since many non-core components are disabled, such as sound. An installation that will only boot into safe mode typically has a major problem, such as disk corruption or the installation of poorly-configured software that prevents the operating system from successfully booting into its normal operating mode.

Though it varies by operating system, safe mode typically loads only essential executable modules and disables devices except for those necessary to display information and accept input. It can also take the form of a parallel "miniature" operating system that has no configuration information shared with the normal operating system. For example, on Microsoft Windows, the user can also choose to boot to the Recovery Console, a small text-based troubleshooting mode kept separate from the main operating system (which can also be accessed by booting the install CD) or to various "safe mode" options that run the dysfunctional OS but with features, such as video drivers, audio, and networking, disabled.

Safe mode typically provides access to utility and diagnostic programs so a user can troubleshoot what is preventing the operating system from working normally. Safe mode is intended for maintenance, not functionality, and it provides minimal access to features.

Operating systems

Windows 
Microsoft Windows' safe mode (for 7/Vista  /XP  /2000/ME/98/95) is accessed by pressing the F8 key as the operating system boots. Also, in a multi-boot environment with multiple versions of Windows installed side by side, the F8 key can be pressed at the OS selector prompt to get to safe mode.  However, under Windows 8 (released in 2012), the traditional press-F8-for-safe-mode-options UI convention no longer works, and either Shift-F8 or a special GUI-based workaround is necessary.

Unix 
An equivalently minimal setting in Unix-like operating systems is single-user mode, in which daemons and the X Window System are not started, and only the root user can log in. It can do emergency repairs or maintenance, including resetting users' passwords on the machine without the need to know the old one.

macOS 
In macOS holding the shift key after powering up activates Safe Boot that has background maintenance features (Besides the mode selection, it runs a file system repair, and in Mac OS 10.4, it disables all fonts other than those in /System/Library/Fonts, moves to the Trash all font caches normally stored in /Library/Caches/com.apple.ATS/(uid)/, where (uid) is a user ID number such as 501, and disables all startup items and any Login Items). Unlike in Windows where safe mode with networking is disabled by default and requires using a safe mode with networking enabled, in the macOS Safe Boot always includes networking.

On the Classic Mac OS versions 6, 7, 8, and 9, a similar mode to the Unix root is achieved by holding down the shift key while booting, which starts the system without extensions.

Android 
The way that safe mode in Android can be activated differs per vendor. Safe mode can be disabled by rebooting the device.

Application software safe mode 
Application software sometimes offers a safe mode as well. In the PHP interpreter, prior to version 5.4, safe mode offers stricter security measures. 
The Glasgow Haskell Compiler from version 7.2 offers "Safe Haskell" mode, restricting usage of functions such as unsafePerformIO. Mozilla Firefox's safe mode allows the user to remove extensions which may be preventing the browser from loading.  Internet Explorer can run in "No Add-Ons" mode and Protected Mode.  Cydia's MobileSubstrate also has a safe mode that allows the user to uninstall tweaks and extensions that may crash the SpringBoard.

See also
 BOOT.INI
 Bcdedit
 MSConfig

References

External links
Mac OS X: Starting up in Safe Mode
MS-DOS source update with Safe Mode
Booting